TBEA Co., Ltd., previously known as Tebian Electric Apparatus, is a Chinese manufacturer of power transformers and other electrical equipment, and a developer of transmission projects.  Along with competitors Tianwei Baobian Electric (TWBB) and the XD Group, it is one of the major Chinese manufacturers of transformers.

International operations

Equipment manufacturing
Outside of China, TBEA is also coming up with a manufacturing base for transformers, solar equipments & cables in Karjan Gujarat, India. The Indian division is registered under the name TBEA Energy (India) Pvt Ltd and will cater to India, African, Middle East and other markets.

Construction engineering
The company builds transformers and also develops transmission lines as an EPC contractor.

In Ethiopia, TBEA was in 2009 awarded the contract to develop the transmission line to Addis Ababa for the Gilgel Gibe III Dam.

In September 2010 in Zambia, the state power company ZESCO signed an EPC contract with TBEA to build US$334 million330 kv high voltage transmission lines, which would supply power to Eastern, Luapula, Northern and Muchinga Provinces.  The project held a groundbreaking in July 2012.  The project is to include two transmissions lines: one from Pensulo substation in Serenje to Kasama via Mpika, another transmission line from Pensulo substation to Chipata via Msoro and extension of the existing Pensulo substation to accommodate the two transmission line bays.

Mining
In Tajikistan the company was granted in 2015 a mining license to develop a gold deposit in exchange for construction of a combined heat and power (CHP) plant in Dushanbe. Earlier, in 2013, TBEA had received a license to conduct exploration at the deposit area.

Power stations
In 2013 the Government of Kyrgyzstan chose TBEA to reconstruct a power plant, a choice made after heavy pressure from the Government of China. Rigged bidding and inflated prices are alleged to cost Kyrgyzstan $111 million, and have led to former Prime Minister Sapar Isakov, among other officials, being charged with corruption. The plant broke down in 2018, shortly after the overhaul was completed.

See also
Quaid-e-Azam Solar Park

References

Companies listed on the Shanghai Stock Exchange
Electrical engineering companies of China
Companies based in Xinjiang
Electric transformer manufacturers
Chinese brands